The eighth and final season of the fantasy drama television series Game of Thrones, produced by HBO, premiered on April 14, 2019, and concluded on May 19, 2019. Unlike the first six seasons, which consisted of ten episodes each, and the seventh season, which consisted of seven episodes, the eighth season consists of only six episodes.

The season was filmed from October 2017 to July 2018 and largely consists of original content not found in George R. R. Martin's A Song of Ice and Fire series, while also incorporating material that Martin has revealed to showrunners about the upcoming novels in the series, The Winds of Winter and A Dream of Spring. The season was adapted for television by David Benioff and D. B. Weiss.

The season was met with mixed reviews from critics, in contrast to the critical acclaim of previous seasons, and is the lowest-rated of the series on the website Rotten Tomatoes. While the performances, production values and music score were praised, criticism was mainly directed at the shorter runtime of the season as well as numerous creative decisions made by the showrunners regarding the plot and character arcs. Many commentators deemed it to be a disappointing conclusion to the series.

The season received 32 nominations at the 71st Primetime Emmy Awards, the most for a single season of television in history. It won twelve, including Outstanding Drama Series and Outstanding Supporting Actor in a Drama Series for Peter Dinklage.

Plot
The final season depicts the culmination of the series' two primary conflicts: the Great War against the Army of the Dead, and the Last War for control of the Iron Throne. In the first half of the season, Jon Snow, Daenerys Targaryen and many of the main characters converge at Winterfell to face the Dead. During the battle, Bran lures the Night King into the open where Arya destroys him; the army of White Walkers and wights crumbles. Meanwhile, Cersei Lannister remains in King's Landing and strengthens her forces to set traps for a weakened Daenerys. The second half of the season resumes the war for the throne as Daenerys suffers losses until she finally assaults King's Landing upon Drogon, her last dragon. She defeats Cersei's forces, burns the city and kills Cersei and her brother Jaime. Daenerys vows to "liberate" the whole world as she has liberated the capital of Westeros. Unable to sway her from her destructive path, an agonized Jon kills her. Drogon flies away with her body, but not before destroying the Iron Throne with dragonfire. The leaders of Westeros choose Bran Stark as King, who grants the North independence and appoints Tyrion his Hand. Sansa Stark is crowned Queen in the North. Arya sails west, and Jon leads the Wildlings north of the Wall.

Episodes

Cast

Main cast

 Peter Dinklage as Tyrion Lannister
 Nikolaj Coster-Waldau as Jaime Lannister
 Lena Headey as Cersei Lannister
 Emilia Clarke as Daenerys Targaryen
 Kit Harington as Jon Snow
 Sophie Turner as Sansa Stark
 Maisie Williams as Arya Stark
 Liam Cunningham as Davos Seaworth
 Nathalie Emmanuel as Missandei
 Alfie Allen as Theon Greyjoy
 John Bradley as Samwell Tarly
 Isaac Hempstead Wright as Bran Stark
 Gwendoline Christie as Brienne of Tarth
 Conleth Hill as Varys
 Rory McCann as Sandor "The Hound" Clegane
 Jerome Flynn as Bronn
 Kristofer Hivju as Tormund Giantsbane
 Joe Dempsie as Gendry
 Jacob Anderson as Grey Worm
 Iain Glen as Jorah Mormont
 Hannah Murray as Gilly
 Carice van Houten as Melisandre

Recurring cast
The recurring actors listed here are those who appeared in season 8. They are listed by the region in which they first appear.

In the North
 Richard Dormer as Beric Dondarrion
 Ben Crompton as Eddison Tollett
 Daniel Portman as Podrick Payne
 Rupert Vansittart as Yohn Royce
 Bella Ramsey as Lyanna Mormont
 Megan Parkinson as Alys Karstark
 Richard Rycroft as Maester Wolkan
 Harry Grasby as Ned Umber
 Staz Nair as Qhono
 Vladimir Furdik as the Night King

In King's Landing
 Pilou Asbæk as Euron Greyjoy
 Anton Lesser as Qyburn
 Hafþór Júlíus Björnsson as Gregor "The Mountain" Clegane
 Gemma Whelan as Yara Greyjoy
 Marc Rissmann as Harry Strickland
 Tobias Menzies as Edmure Tully
 Lino Facioli as Robin Arryn

Production

Development
HBO announced the eighth and final season of the fantasy drama television series Game of Thrones in July 2016. Like the previous season, it largely consists of original content not found in George R. R. Martin's A Song of Ice and Fire series. As Benioff had verified in March 2015, the creators have talked with Martin about the end of the series, and they "know where things are heading". He explained that the ends of both the television and the book series would unavoidably be thematically similar, although Martin could still make some changes to surprise the readers. When asked about why the television series is coming to an end, he said, "this is where the story ends."

Crew
Series creators and executive producers David Benioff and D. B. Weiss serve as showrunners for the eighth season. The directors for the eighth season were announced in September 2017. Miguel Sapochnik, who previously directed "The Gift" and "Hardhome" in the fifth season, as well as "Battle of the Bastards" and "The Winds of Winter" in the sixth season, returned to direct two episodes. David Nutter, who had directed two episodes each in the second, third, and fifth seasons, including "The Rains of Castamere" and "Mother's Mercy", directed three episodes for the eighth season. The final episode of the series was directed by Benioff and Weiss, who have previously co-directed two episodes, taking credit for one episode each.

At the series' South by Southwest panel on March 12, 2017, Benioff and Weiss announced the writers for the series to be Dave Hill (episode 1) and Bryan Cogman (episode 2). The showrunners divided up the screenplay for the remaining four episodes amongst themselves.

Writing
Writing for the eighth season started with a 140-page outline. Benioff said that the divvying up process and who should write what section became more difficult because "this would be the last time that [they] would be doing this."

Filming
In an interview with Entertainment Weekly, HBO programming president Casey Bloys said that instead of the series finale's being a feature film, the final season would be "six one-hour movies" on television. He continued, "The show has proven that TV is every bit as impressive and in many cases more so, than film. What they're doing is monumental." Filming officially began on October 23, 2017 and concluded in July 2018. Many exterior scenes were filmed in Northern Ireland and a few in Dubrovnik, Croatia; Paint Hall Studios in Belfast were used for interior filming. The direwolf scenes were filmed in Alberta, Canada.

Casting
The eighth season saw the return of Tobias Menzies as Edmure Tully and Lino Facioli as Robin Arryn in the final episode, neither of whom appeared in the seventh season. Marc Rissmann was cast as Harry Strickland, the commander of the Golden Company.

Content
Co-creators David Benioff and D. B. Weiss have said that the seventh and eighth seasons would likely comprise fewer episodes, saying that after the sixth season, they were "down to our final 13 episodes after this season. We're heading into the final lap". Benioff and Weiss said that they were unable to produce 10 episodes in the series' usual 12 to 14-month timeframe, as Weiss explained, "It's crossing out of a television schedule into more of a mid-range movie schedule." HBO confirmed in July 2016 that the seventh season would consist of seven episodes and would premiere later than usual in mid-2017 because of the later filming schedule. Benioff and Weiss later confirmed that the eighth season would consist of six episodes and would premiere later than usual for the same reason.

Benioff and Weiss said about the end of the series: "From the beginning, we've wanted to tell a 70-hour movie. It will turn out to be a 73-hour movie, but it's stayed relatively the same of having the beginning, middle[,] and now we're coming to the end. It would have been really tough if we lost any core cast members along the way[;] I'm very happy we've kept everyone and we get to finish it the way we want to." The first two episodes are, respectively, 54 and 58 minutes long, while the final four episodes of the series are all more than an hour in length—episode three is 82 minutes (making it the longest episode of the series), episodes four and five are each 78 minutes, and the final episode is 80 minutes.

A two-hour documentary, Game of Thrones: The Last Watch, which documents the making of the eighth season, aired on May 26, the week after the series finale.

Music

Ramin Djawadi returned as the series' composer for the eighth season. The soundtrack album for the season was released digitally on May 19, 2019 and was released on CD on July 19, 2019.

Release

Broadcast
The season premiered on April 14, 2019 in the United States on HBO.

Marketing
On December 6, 2018, HBO released the first official teaser trailer for the eighth season. A second teaser trailer was released on January 13, 2019, which announced the premiere date as April 14, 2019. The trailer was directed by David Nutter. HBO released a promotional advertisement with Bud Light on February 3, 2019 during Super Bowl LIII. Later, first-look photos of several main characters were released on February 6, 2019. On February 28, posters of many of the main characters sitting upon the Iron Throne were released. The official full trailer was released on March 5, 2019.

Illegal distribution
The season premiere was reportedly pirated by nearly 55 million people within the first 24 hours of release. Of these numbers, 9.5 million downloads came from India, 5.2 million came from China, and 4 million came from the U.S. On April 21, 2019, it was reported that the second episode of the season was illegally leaked online hours before it aired due to being streamed early on Amazon Prime Germany. On May 5, 2019, it was reported that the fourth episode of the season was leaked online, with footage from the episode circulating on social media.

Home media
The season was released on Ultra HD Blu-ray, Blu-ray, and DVD on December 3, 2019.

Reception

Critical response

The season received mixed reviews from critics. On Rotten Tomatoes, it holds an approval rating of 55% based on 22 reviews with an average rating of 6.45/10, the lowest rating for a season of Game of Thrones. The website's critical consensus reads: "Game of Thrones final season shortchanges the women of Westeros, sacrificing satisfying character arcs for spectacular set-pieces in its mad dash to the finish line". 

The first three episodes were met with generally positive feedback from critics. On Metacritic, the premiere garnered a score of 75 out of 100 based on 12 reviews, indicating "generally favorable reviews". "The Long Night" was praised for the cinematography and grand scale of the battle between the living and the dead, but was criticized for what was considered its lack of catharsis, disorienting lighting, and the anticlimactic ending of the White Walker storyline that had been built up for seven seasons. "The Last of the Starks" and "The Bells" were said to have rushed pacing, writing, and deviation from character development, with "The Last of the Starks" being labeled as "anticlimactic" and "a huge letdown". "The Iron Throne" was described as "divisive", and according to Rotten Tomatoes, the series finale represents "a modest rebound" but it "went out with a whimper". "The Bells" and "The Iron Throne" are the worst-reviewed episodes of the entire series on the website, with an approval of 49% and 48% respectively, while the last four episodes of the season "plunged to record low scores".

David Sims of The Atlantic wrote that the final season "has been the same story over and over again: a lot of tin-eared writing trying to justify some of the most drastic story developments imaginable, as quickly as possible. As usual, the actors did their best with what was on the page." Lucy Mangan of The Guardian considered the season a "rushed business. It has wasted opportunities, squandered goodwill, and failed to do justice to its characters or its actors." Zack Beauchamp of Vox wrote that it "dispensed almost entirely with trying to make sense of its characters' internal motivations—let alone the complex political reality that its psychological realism initially helped create". Huw Fullerton of Radio Times said the final season was not "Thrones at its best" but still had "some sort of ending for the characters". For Fullerton, the season was "like the finale — some bits I liked, one or two I loved, an awful lot that leaves me scratching my head".

Writing for USA Today, Kelly Lawler felt that the series ultimately betrayed its "identity" of "tragedy and injustice" with a "pandering" ending. Judy Berman of Time said that the series failed to complete the answer to "conflicting ideas about freedom, justice and leadership", themes that had brought depth to the series. Ellen Gray of the Philadelphia Inquirer and Darren Franich of Entertainment Weekly agreed that the final season was not as complex as previous seasons. Franich stated that the "broseph mentality shined through," shunting the development and interaction between female characters. Franich criticized Cersei for doing nothing this season, regarding it "one complete failure of imagination", as well as the ultimate primary focus on the reactions and thoughts of the male characters, such as "Jon Snow, the least complicated main character." Writing for The Hollywood Reporter, Maureen Ryan condemned what she considered the season’s reductive treatment of women, and "decisions set up and executed with little or no foresight or thoughtfulness", declaring the penultimate episode "The Bells" as "Game of Thrones at its worst".

Ratings

Audience response
A petition to HBO for "competent writers" to remake the eighth season of Game of Thrones in a manner "that makes sense" was started on Change.org after "The Last of the Starks" aired, but went viral after "The Bells" aired and saw Daenerys's arc take a significant turn. The petition described showrunners David Benioff and D. B. Weiss as "woefully incompetent writers". By September 6, 2019, it received over 1.73 million signatures. Digital Spy reported that some fans of the series criticized the season for the way it handled several character arcs and the "rushed" pacing. The petition's creator stated that he never expected HBO to remake the season, but saw the petition as a message "of frustration and disappointment at its core". 

The petition was labelled as "disrespectful to the crew and the filmmakers" by actress Sophie Turner (who plays Sansa Stark), "ridiculous", "weird, juvenile" by actor Isaac Hempstead Wright (who plays Bran Stark), "rude" by actor Jacob Anderson (who plays Grey Worm) and "fandom extremism" by actress Carice van Houten (who plays Melisandre). Emilia Clarke (who plays Daenerys Targaryen) indicated she was previously unaware of the petition, but gave a warmer response when she was asked what she would want to see happen if the eighth season were redone: "I can only speak to my own character, and the people that I interact with on the show. But I would've loved some more scenes with me and Missandei. I would've loved some more scenes with me and Cersei".

Richard Roeper, writing for the Chicago Sun Times, wrote: "Over the last 25+ years, I've reviewed thousands of movies and dozens of TV shows, and I don't think I've ever seen the level of fan (and to a lesser degree, critical) vitriol leveled at [this show] in recent weeks". However, Roeper noted that social media was not yet widely used during much of this time period.

Lenika Cruz, writing for The Atlantic, wrote that with the end of the series, "there are folks who don't feel as though the hours and hours they've devoted to this show have been wasted", but "there are many others" who felt the opposite. Kelly Lawler of USA Today wrote that the ultimate ending of the series was not what some fans "signed up for".

CBS News has described several plot points that some fans are dissatisfied with: the character arcs of Daenerys and Jaime; the fates of Jaime, Missandei, Rhaegal, and the Night King; the Battle of Winterfell being visually too dark; the "basic existence of Euron Greyjoy"; and "Jon's treatment of Ghost".

Cast response
In an interview with The New Yorker, Emilia Clarke said she had to hold back her innermost anxiety from Beyoncé: "I was just, like, Oh, my God, my absolute idol in life is saying that she likes me, and I know for a fact that by the end of this season she's going to hate me. ... All I wanted to scream was 'Please, please still like me even though my character turns into a mass-killing dictator! Please still think that I'm representing women in a really fabulous way.'" Clarke said she was shocked at Daenerys's turn and her last scene because "it comes out of nowhere". Although she stands by the character, Clarke said it was a "struggle" reading the scripts. As for what she would have changed, she said she would have liked more scenes between Daenerys and Missandei and Daenerys and Cersei; "I just think more dissection and those beautifully written scenes that the boys have between characters — that we are more than happy to contently sit there and watch ten minutes of two people talking, because it's beautiful. I just wanted to see a bit more of that."

In an interview published as the final season premiered, Kit Harington said he felt "defiant" about the series at the time, adding that "whatever critic spends half an hour writing about this season and makes their [negative] judgement on it, in my head they can go fuck themselves. I know how much work was put into this ... Now if people feel let down by [this final season], I don't give a fuck—because everyone [working on the series] tried their hardest. ... In the end, no one's bigger fans of the show than we are". Harrington later said he expected the ending was going to divide fans, and he was concerned the final two episodes would be deemed sexist: "We have Cersei and Dany, two leading women, who fall". "The justification is: Just because they're women, why should they be the goodies? They're the most interesting characters in the show. You can't just say the strong women are going to end up the good people ... It's going to open up discussion ... And when have you ever seen a woman play a dictator?" Harrington also said he was disappointed his character Jon did not kill the Night King.

Nathalie Emmanuel, who played Missandei, was heartbroken when she read her character's sudden demise: "I think the fact that she died in chains when she was a slave her whole life, that for me was a pungent cut for that character, that felt so painful". Emmanuel, the only woman of color who was a regular cast member for the last several seasons, said, "It's safe to say that Game of Thrones has been under criticism for their lack of representation, and the truth of it is that Missandei and Grey Worm have represented so many people because there's only two of them." Emmanuel added that she wished she "had more time or scenes this season maybe with Daenerys or even with Cersei, scenes where we get to see her being brilliant before she dies. I think that might have eased the pain a bit more for people, and reinforcing a friendship that she and Dany had because we haven't really seen anything for a few seasons."

Conleth Hill, who played Varys, told Entertainment Weekly that the seventh and eighth seasons were "kind of frustrating" and not his "favorite", noting that Varys "kind of dropped off the edge". Hill reacted with "dismay" to Varys apparently "losing his knowledge", commenting, "If he was such an intelligent man and he had such resources, how come he didn't know about things?" After being "very bummed to not have a final scene with [Littlefinger]", Hill was "bummed not to have any reaction to [Littlefinger] dying, if he was [Varys'] nemesis". Also, once the series ran out of book material as a source, Hill said that "special niche interest in weirdos wasn't as effective as it had been". However, Hill was "not dissatisfied on the whole" regarding the series.

Lena Headey had a "mixed" initial reaction to the manner of death for Cersei Lannister. Headey said she would rather have had Cersei die by "some big piece or fight with somebody". Fellow actor Nikolaj Coster-Waldau and Headey discussed it and then appreciated the scene, viewing it as "the perfect ending" for Cersei and Jaime as they "came into the world together and now they leave together". Headey mentioned that a scene of Cersei's miscarriage was cut.

Sophie Turner said she would like to have seen "Sansa and Cersei reunited, or Arya and Cersei", but she was happy with the ending for her character. Maisie Williams said the biggest regret for her character Arya was not getting a scene with Cersei, and possibly killing her, "even if it means [Arya] dies too". She later embraced Arya's happier arc for the last season.

Gwendoline Christie, who played Brienne, said she was "dismayed" by her character turn, explaining that "It was partially because I read about this character [in Martin's novels] before I saw the show. So we all have our own ideas about how we think the character is going to develop. Sometimes your ideas become set in your mind, and sometimes David and Dan write something you didn't expect and find difficult to comprehend." "[Brienne] has been very impactful in the way I think about women and in the way they're portrayed in the media and the way they're treated in society", she noted.

Joe Dempsie (Gendry), also expressed disappointment over the series' finale, as did former cast members Charles Dance (Tywin Lannister) and Natalia Tena (Osha).

Accolades

With 32 nominations, Game of Thrones broke the record of the most nominations received by a regular TV show in a single year.

Notes

References

External links

  – official US site
  – official UK site
 Game of Thrones– The Viewers Guide on HBO
 
 Making Game of Thrones on HBO

Season 8
2019 American television seasons